Beri is a town and a Municipal committee in the Jhajjar district in Indian state of Haryana. Beri is one of the largest tehsils of Haryana State including 77 villages. Beri City is situated on Road Connecting Gurgaon to Hisar and Kosli (Rewari) to Rohtak. This is the middle of these four cities. The First Chief Minister of Haryana, Bhagwat Dayal Sharma, was from Beri village. The Town has a world famous temple dedicated to the goddess Mata Bhimeshwari Devi and Lord Krishna. The "Beri Pashu Mela" or "Beri Cattle Fair" is celebrated in the days of Navratra every 6 months and is famous for its donkeys and horses.

Demographics
 India census, Beri had a population of Approx. 30,000. Males constitute 54% of the population and females 46%. Beri has an average literacy rate of 70% Higher than the national average of 59.5%; with 57% of the males and 43% of females literate. 13% of the population is under 6 years of age.

Overview
Beri City is the Administrative Headquarters of Beri Sub-division (a Tehsil before 15 August 2009) in Jhajjar district in the state of Haryana, India. Sant Lal Pachar became its first SDM and Presently Dr. Rahul narwal IAS holds the post of SDM Beri. The city  has its own Tehsil Head office, Sub Divisional Courts and Mini Secretariat on Jhajjar-Hisar Highway. Presently H.S. Dahiya holds the post of Tehsildar Beri. Beri has two gausalas on the outskirts Beri City is also famous for its Khoya Burffis of madan halwai and for Gunga Halwai, famous Samose of Bhagwan Das Halwai, M Naanu Halwai. Beri has its own Police Station on Gurgaon-jhajjar-Bhiwani Road. The Police Station is headed by Sh. Daya Chand (SHO).

History
Beri Town and Sub-Division, which previously fell under District Rohtak, Haryana, is now a part of newly created District Jhajjar from 15 July 1997 onwards.

Transportation
Beri is situated on Gurgaon-Bhiwani-Hisar-Sirsa Highway with easy road access to Bahadurgarh, Rohtak, Bhiwani, Tosham, Gurgaon, Faridabad, Hisar, Sirsa, Palwal, Hanumangarh, Ganganagar, Delhi, Chandigarh, and Jaipur.  The nearest Metro station of  the Delhi metro in honour of Hoshiar Singh (Brigadier) Brigadier Hoshiyar Singh metro station Green Line is located at 28 kms and Najafgarh metro 45 kilometres away.

Railways
The nearest railway station is Jhajjar Station at a distance of 13 kms. Other major stations close to Beri are: Rohtak  30 kms; Bahadurgarh 28 kms; Bhiwani 45 kms; Rewari  60 kms;  and Delhi  60 kms.

Schools
 Govt. Model Sr. Sec. School (Boys) Beri
 Govt. Model Sr. Sec. School (Girls) Beri
 Govt. College For Women & Polytechnic (under construction)
 Holy High School, Pana- Chhajan, Beri
 M.B.D. International School, Rohtak Road, Beri
 Brig. Ran Singh Public School Dujana, Teh- Beri, District-Jhajjar
 D.A.V. Public School, Pana-Baithan, Beri
Saraswati Shishu Mandir, Gaushala Road. Beri
 Rama Krishana Vidhya Mandir Bahadurgarh Road Beri
 Takshila Vidhapeeth Beri
 R.C.M SR. SEC. School Jahazgarh Beri

Kadian Khap
Beri City is known as the Heart of Kadian Khap. Kadian Khap has 12 villages near by Beri. The चबूतरा of Kadian Khap is situated in the near village chimani. There are some another famous Gotra royal families also in the Beri City which are migrated from the other villages and establish here like Rana. The present pardhan of Kadian Khap is बिल्लू पहलवान बेरी प्रधान and केदार सिंह कादियाण. The villages of Kadian Khap are- Beri Khas, Dubaldhan, Siwana, Majra, Wazirpur, Dharana, Mangawas, Baghpur, Chimani, Bishan, Dhaur, Bakra

Various facilities
 General Bus Stand
 U.H.B.V.N Electricity Sub Station JHAJJAR-Hisar Road
 BSNL Telephone Exchange DADRI Road
 New Grain Market Savitri Chowk Beri
 Municipal Committee Bus Stand Road
 Pt.B.D Sharma General Hospital Opp. Bus stand
 Police Station and Police Post BHIWANI Road
 Mini Secretariat and Courts BHIWANI -Jhajjar Road
 Bharpai Devi Stadium Bhiwani-Jhajjar Road
 Head Post Office-124201
 General Water Works No.1 & 2 Rohtak Road
 City Park
 Government Library
 C.S.D Chinkara Canteen JHAJJAR Road
 BDPO & Tehsil Complex State Highway-122
 Stadium of various games
 Gulia Nursing Home

Mata Bhimeshwari Devi

Mata Bhimeshwari Devi temple in Beri a huge fair is held at the occasion of Navratra's twice in a year. In the famous temple of Bhimeshwari Devi lakhs of devotees from all over the country come and worship the goddess In the market, hundreds of shops are decorated at the occasion of the fair. In these fairs newly married couples come to tie the nuptial knot again before the goddess .The Mundan ceremony of small children is also performed here. After reaching the temple and waiting for a long lakhs of Devotes light the "Jyot" of desi ghee and offer coconut and parsad to the goddess. Here, after the government has taken the charge of the temple, continuous efforts have been made to beautify the temple. With devotion and faith, the devotees arrive here, It seems that Beri is not less important than any other religious places devoted to goddess Devi's chanting.

In the Beri the enhancing of goddess's name echoes all the time. According to the well-known story, it is named, Bhimeshwari due to the installation of the idol of the goddess by Bhima. According to the saying before the beginning of the battle of the Mahabharta period Shri Krishna told Mahabali Bhima to bring his Kuldevi to the battlefield of the Kurukshetra and take the blessing from her. According to the order of Shri Krishna and his brother "Yudhistar", Bhima approached the Hinglay Mountain (which is now in Pakistan) and prayed the kuldevi to move to the battle field for victory. The goddess accepted the request of Bhima but laid down a condition, she said that she was ready to go with him but if he dropped me down on the way from the lap then she would not proceed further. In the way Bhima felt the desire to go to toilet so he placed the idol of the goddess under a tree of Beri from his lap and went on, after toilet, he also felt thirsty but he could not find any water near by. Bhima blowed the earth with his gada to take out water and took bath. After that when he tried to lift the goddess, he reminded her condition, and under compulsion, Bhima placed the goddess near the bank of the pond and went to Kurukshetra after seeking the blessing for victory. After 18 days of war when Kaurva's got killed Gandhari reached the place screaming. Often said that here only Shri Krishna took out from the illusion. When Gandhari passed from there she saw her own kuldevi. After that she erected the temple here. Although the ruins of the temple erected by Gandhari are not present now, but of the seat of the great goddess is still there. Presently, marvelous temple is here. In Beri, there are two temples. The process of moving the goddess from outer to inner temple has been going on since the Mahabharta period.

At that time there was a dense forest. Maharishi Durvasa was residing in Dubaldhan around 8 kms from here in fear of thieves. Every morning at 5 a.m. Mahrishi Dhurava would bring the idol of goddess in the outer temple in his lap and at 12:00 noon again he would return it in the inner temple. The process of moving of goddess from inner to outer temple is still going on. The aarti sung by durvasa is still enchanted everyday and every evening. The " Akhand Jyoti" for 24 hrs is enlightening. also said to be City of temples and Religious City in Haryana State. The City Has around 100 Small and large Temples. The Mata Bhimeshwari Temple, Bala Ji Temple, Radha Krishna mandir main bazaar are main temples in the city. People also come to the temple on foot from long distances.

Notable people
 Raghuvir Singh Kadian, MLA of Beri
 Bharat Singh Lambardar, Lambardar Beri Khas
 Bhagwat Dayal Sharma, first Chief Minister of Haryana

References

Cities and towns in Jhajjar district